The 1982 United States Senate election in Michigan took place on November 2, 1982. Incumbent Democratic U.S. Senator Don Riegle was re-elected to a second term in office, defeating Republican U.S. Representative Philip Ruppe.

Republican primary

Candidates
 Deane Baker, candidate for U.S. Senate in 1976
 William S. Ballenger Jr., son of Buick Motors founder William Ballenger and candidate for U.S. Representative in 1974
 Robert J. Huber, former U.S. Representative from Troy and candidate for U.S. Senate in 1970 and 1976
 Philip Ruppe, former U.S. Representative from Houghton

Results

General election

Results

See also 
 1982 United States Senate elections

References

1982
Michigan
United States Senate